Winnie-the-Pooh is a fictional teddy bear, and the central character in the book series by A. A. Milne.

The term Winnie-the-Pooh or Pooh Bear may also refer to:

 Winnie-the-Pooh (book), the first volume of stories about the fictional bear, published in 1926 
 Winnie the Pooh (franchise), a Walt Disney franchise based on the books; including TV series, animated feature films, and theme in-park appearances
 Winnie the Pooh (Disney character), a character in the franchise
 "Winnie the Pooh" (song), a 1966 theme song written by the Sherman Brothers
 The Many Adventures of Winnie the Pooh, a 1977 American animated film
 Welcome to Pooh Corner, a live-action television series that aired from 1983 to 1986
 The New Adventures of Winnie the Pooh, an animated television series that aired from 1988 to 1991
 The Book of Pooh, a puppet television series that aired from 2001 to 2003
 My Friends Tigger & Pooh, a computer-animated television series that aired from 2007 to 2010
 Winnie the Pooh (2011 film), a 2011 American animated film
 Winnie-the-Pooh (1969 film), a 1969 Russian animated film by Soyuzmultfilm
 Winnie-the-Pooh: Blood and Honey, a 2023 British independent slasher film by Rhys Frake-Waterfield
 Poo Bear, stage name of American musician and songwriter Jason Boyd
 Óscar Guerrero Silva, Mexican drug lord known for his Winnie Pooh alias.
 A controversial nickname of Xi Jinping given to him for a resemblance of his photo to a shot from a Disney cartoon

See also
 Poohsticks, a game first mentioned in The House at Pooh Corner (1928)
"House at Pooh Corner" (song), a 1970 song written by Kenny Loggins
Return to Pooh Corner, a 1994 album by Kenny Loggins
Return to the Hundred Acre Wood, a 2009 book that serves as a sequel to Milne's original tales
 Pooh (band), an Italian pop band named after Winnie-the-Pooh